Susana Stephenson Pérez (born 26 May 1948) is a Mexican politician affiliated with the National Action Party. As of 2014 she served as Senator of the LVIII and LIX Legislatures of the Mexican Congress representing Guanajuato as replacement of Juan Manuel Oliva.

References

1948 births
Living people
People from Veracruz (city)
Women members of the Senate of the Republic (Mexico)
Members of the Senate of the Republic (Mexico)
National Action Party (Mexico) politicians
Politicians from Veracruz
21st-century Mexican politicians
21st-century Mexican women politicians